Talk of Angels is a film directed in 1996 by Nick Hamm, but not released by its production company, Miramax, until 1998.

Based on the 1936 novel Mary Lavelle by Kate O'Brien, which was banned in Ireland when first published, with a script co-written by Ann Guedes and Frank McGuinness, Talk Of Angels tells the story of a young Irish governess who travels to Spain in the mid-1930s to teach English to the young daughters of a prominent family. Over the course of the film, she becomes drawn to the family's married eldest son, and their affair unfolds with the increasing violence associated with the early days of the Spanish Civil War as a backdrop.

Cast

Polly Walker as Mary Lavelle
Vincent Perez as Francisco Areavaga
Franco Nero as Dr. Vicente Areavaga
Marisa Paredes as Doña Consuelo
Leire Berrocal as Milagros
Penélope Cruz as Pilar
Frances McDormand as Conlon
Ruth McCabe as O'Toole
Francisco Rabal as Don Jorge
Ariadna Gil as Beatriz
Rossy de Palma as Elena
Britta Smith as Duggan
Anita Reeves as Harty
Veronica Duffy as Keogh
Jorge de Juan as Jaime
Ellea Ratier as Leonor
Angelina Llongueras as Ana
Jaume Valls as Pablo
Jose Sacristan as– Carlos
Oscar Higares as Matador
Tusse Silberg as Aunt Cristina
Jose Manuel Ortigosa as Singing Boy

Reception
The film received mostly unfavorable comparisons to Casablanca, Dr. Zhivago, The Garden of the Finzi-Continis, Jane Eyre, Gone With the Wind, and The Leopard.

Entertainment Weekly described it as "Casablanca-derived" but called the main characters "blandly pretty" and "pretty bland".

The LA Times argued that "Walker remains the primary distraction" and that "the sum, as they all too often say, is not quite that of the parts. And "Talk of Angels" unfortunately exists in that romance-novel realm in which political concerns are mere adornments for the treacle-dripping issues of the heart."

The New York Times noted that "Talk of Angels is the third and weakest movie to be released this year in which the central character is a beautiful, charming, clever, wise young governess who becomes romantically entangled with someone in her employer's family," and complained that it was "so badly butchered in the cutting room that crucial dramatic confrontations are strangely missing."

Variety said in its review that "As the would-be lovers, Walker and Perez are individually charismatic and undeniably attractive, but together they generate about as much heat as Lake Placid in February", continuing that "Talk of Angels doesn't use the politics of war to create tension between the lovers; it's as if the war were irrelevant to their personal drama."

The New York Daily News was favorable, calling it "a romantic, intelligent Jane Eyre-like story" and said that "director Nick Hamm makes a worthy feature debut, backed by a solid cast."

Boxoffice wrote that it "is an undeniably beautiful and often seductive tale of colliding cultural sensibilities and ferocious passions" but that "the passions depicted on-screen are fairly tepid ones, playing more like a dime novel than the meaningful epic the filmmakers intended."

Film4s summary was that it was "elevated above the ordinary by strong performances and a vivacious feel".

References

External links

Spanish Civil War films
Films based on romance novels
Films based on Irish novels
Films scored by Trevor Jones
1990s English-language films
American romance films
American war films
Films directed by Nick Hamm
1990s American films